Mark James Brown (born 5 August 1984, in Motherwell) is a Scottish footballer who plays for Alloa Athletic. He can play in defence or as a midfielder.

Career

Brown began his career with Rangers. He was released by the Ibrox outfit after a serious injury to his spine, and gave up football, after thinking he would never play again.

Brown got back into the game with Lanarkshire side Eddlewood Amateurs. Brown was a key player in the side, and it was his spectacular long range strike which won Eddlewood the Scottish Amateur Cup in May 2008.

Brown returned to the senior game in June 2008, when he was given a two-year contract at Clyde. He made his Clyde debut in July 2008, in a 2-0 victory over Annan Athletic in the Scottish Challenge Cup. A week later, he scored an equaliser in the fifth minute of injury time in a 1-1 draw with Greenock Morton, in his league debut. Brown's contract was terminated in June 2009, following Clyde's relegation and financial troubles. He went on to sign for Alloa Athletic.

Statistics
Correct as of 16 January 2009

See also
Clyde F.C. season 2008-09

References

External links

1984 births
Living people
Footballers from Motherwell
Scottish footballers
Rangers F.C. players
Clyde F.C. players
Alloa Athletic F.C. players
Scottish Football League players
Association football defenders
Association football midfielders